Donald Hugh Henry  is Enterprise Professor of Environmentalism at the Melbourne Sustainable Society Institute, University of Melbourne.

He is also an International Board member of Al Gore's ‘Climate Reality Project'.

From 1998 to 2014 Henry was the Chief Executive Officer of the Australian Conservation Foundation.

Awards 

 1991: Global 500 Environment Award from the United Nations Environment Program in recognition of outstanding practical achievements in the protection of the environment.
 2008: Equity Trustees Not For Profit CEO of the Year award
 2013: United States Association of Australia Prime Minister's Environmentalist of the Year Award.
 2018: Member of the Order of Australia (AM) as recognition for his significant work in protecting Australia's native wildlife and the environment.

References

External links
Don Henry Speech to QPSU Council March 2008 
Address to the National Press Club, 9 April 2008

See also
Geoff Mosley

Year of birth missing (living people)
Living people
Australian environmentalists
Academic staff of the University of Melbourne
Members of the Order of Australia